Leucania tacuna is a species of moth of the family Noctuidae. It is found in Congo, Uganda, Kenya and South Africa.

References

External links
Africanmoths: images & distribution map

Leucania
Moths of Africa
Moths described in 1874